HeadOn is the brand name of a topical product claimed to relieve headaches. It achieved widespread notoriety in 2006 as a result of a repetitive commercial, consisting only of the tagline "HeadOn. Apply directly to the forehead", stated three times in succession. Originally sold as a homeopathic preparation, the brand was transferred in 2008 to Sirvision, Inc., who re-introduced the product with a new formulation.

Commercial
HeadOn's notoriety came in part because of its advertisements on cable and daytime programming on broadcast television which consisted of using only the tagline "HeadOn. Apply directly to the forehead", stated three times in succession, accompanied by a video of a model using the product without ever directly stating the product's purpose.

Manufacturer Miralus Healthcare decided not to include any factual claims about the product in the spots after the National Advertising Division of the Better Business Bureau objected to the claim that HeadOn provided "fast, safe, effective" headache relief made in an earlier spot. A previous campaign included the phrase "Should I know about HeadOn?"

Miralus Healthcare used focus groups to try a number of potential commercials, with one focused solely on repetition; the focus groups recalled the ads much more than with any other method, although many people considered them irritating. Dan Charron, vice president of sales and marketing at Miralus, told the Los Angeles Times that nobody in the focus groups had told him that the ads were irritating.

Reception
The commercial led to a number of parodies appearing on Web sites such as YouTube, USA Today reports, including extended versions of the ad which loop the repetitive tagline for durations upwards of ten hours, eventually making it an internet meme. The technophile magazine Make describes how to turn it into a ringtone. The commercial is parodied in the 2008 spoof film Disaster Movie where a parodic depiction of Giselle from Enchanted is seen using the product.

Ownership transfer
On September 26, 2008, ownership of the HeadOn brand and its manufacture were transferred to Sirvision, Inc. of North America.  Sirvision re-introduced HeadOn with a new formulation, claiming it now contains "a clinically proven active ingredient for topical headache relief." There were no peer-reviewed studies showing that the original HeadOn formula worked, and the scientific consensus is that homeopathic preparations do not help beyond the placebo effect. The new formulation has not yet been investigated.

Sirvision Inc, which bought the product line, have stated that they intend to refocus the infamous advertisements in a "more scientific direction".

Other products
Three related products are currently produced by former manufacturer of HeadOn Miralus Healthcare:

 ActivOn – described on the company's website as a topical analgesic for arthritis-like joint pains, in multiple formulations.  Additionally, the product originally named FirstOn, a topical anti-itch product, is now called ActivOn Maximum Strength Anti-Itch.
 PreferOn – A topical product containing Vitamin E, claimed to improve the appearance of scars
 RenewIn – A pill claimed to improve joint comfort, flexibility and mobility, in multiple formulations

A homeopathic hemorrhoid cream, FREEdHem, was withdrawn from the market. Like HeadOn, FREEdHem featured repetition in its ads, which said "Freedom from hemorrhoids, FREEdHem hemorrhoid cream" or "FREEdHem, the only one-application hemorrhoidal cream" three times.

Ingredients

The original homeopathic formula was purportedly developed at the Herpolscheimer clinic in Graz, Austria.  It was originally distributed by Miralus Healthcare.

There were two versions of HeadOn available in markets/stores: ExtraStrength and Migraine.  Chemical analysis of the Migraine formulation has shown that the product consists almost entirely of wax. The three "active ingredients" are iris versicolor 12X, white bryony 12X, and potassium dichromate 6X.  The "X" notation indicates that the three chemicals have been diluted to 1 part per trillion, 1 part per trillion, and 1 part per million respectively. This amount of dilution is so great that the product has been described as a placebo; with skeptic James Randi calling it a "major medical swindle".  The formula for the Extra Strength version of the product is the same as the Migraine except that it excludes the iris versicolor.

Seymour Diamond, director of the Diamond Headache Clinic in Chicago and the inpatient headache unit at St. Joseph Hospital, was quoted as saying "I see nothing in this product that has any validity whatsoever." Consumer Reports states that no clinical-trial data involving HeadOn have been presented, and that "any apparent efficacy may be the result of the placebo effect."

Correspondence was published with a statement from HeadOn Customer Service that "It works through the nerves."

Criticisms 
Unlike traditional headache medicines, the efficacy of HeadOn has not been systematically studied in any controlled scientific experimental study. In line with other homeopathic medicines, Miralus Healthcare claims that the medicinal properties of HeadOn's ingredients are released via its dilution technique. However, the dilution technique leaves virtually none of the active ingredient in the product, and nowhere in scientific literature has the claim been supported that dilutions are effective in releasing the medicinal properties of any ingredients.

Moreover, none of HeadOn's ingredients have any scientifically supported effectiveness in treatment of a headache. One of the ingredients, white bryony, is a highly toxic berry that is lethal if 40 such berries are ingested; however, dilution leaves virtually none of the effects in the product, which is why its makers can claim the treatment has no side effects (or any effects at all). Another ingredient, goldenseal (Hydrastis canadensis), has no known effectiveness in the treatment of any condition.
 
The efficacy of the HeadOn product is supported by a few questionable testimonials found on the Miralus Healthcare website. Miralus also markets many other questionable healthcare products containing low, if any, levels of any active ingredients.

References

External links
Official website (archived)
Slate Magazine's review of the ad
Voice Magazine's criticism of the ad and product

American television commercials
2000s television commercials
Internet memes
Homeopathic remedies
Internet memes introduced in 2006
Film and television memes